Tauno Kangro (born 25 May 1966 in Tallinn) is an Estonian sculptor.

In 1993 he graduated from Estonian Academy of Arts.

His works are exhibited in more than 70 personal exhibitions over the world. Among other sculptures he has also created monumental sculptures.

Works
 2002: "Tarvas"
 2002: "Suur Tõll ja Piret said hea kalasaagi"
 2006: "Kalevipoeg kündmas"
 2010: "Õnnelik korstnapühkija"
 "Mõtlik mees" ('Thoughtful Man')
 "Bonne fée de maison"
 Kiss monument

Gallery

References

1966 births
Living people
Estonian sculptors
Estonian Academy of Arts alumni
People from Tallinn